Kunchithanny is a village situated in the Idukki district in the Indian state of Kerala. Located on the banks of the river Muthirappuzha, this village is home to people from different parts of the state of Kerala.

History

The village of Kunchithanny was founded as a settlement by farmers who moved here in the early 1950s from the neighboring districts of Kottayam, Pathanamthitta and Ernakulam. These settlers came here to make a  livelihood from cutting lumber and farming (plantation and food crops), by encroaching upon the forest area which was then part of the princely state of Travancore.

Over the years people who came to the region for the construction of different hydroelectric projects also settled here post the completion of the work.

Indigenous residents are the various tribal communities who have lived here for centuries and can be found even today in the various tribal settlements.

Culture

With the majority of residents being descendant from settlers who migrated here from the neighboring districts of Kottayam and Ernakulam, the local food, Language and culture are similar to those of these districts. The culture constitutes one form of what is described as Hi-range culture.

Hospitals and Clinics

The people of Kunchithanny are served by Johns Clinic run by Dr P J Varghese and Dr Rossama Varghese. The hospital has been functional for more than 25 years and provides basic consultation, lab and in patient facilities. For the people of Kunchithanny the Johns Clinic has been meeting their medical requirements in an efficient and cost effective manner for the past many years. For specialized treatment people can either visit the General Hospital in Munnar or the Morning Star hospital situated in Adimali.

How to reach here

The nearest railway station to kunchithanny is Aluva station which is situated 110 kilometers away on the Cochin Dhanushkodi national highway.

The nearest airport is Cochin (nedumbassery) international airport.

People who arrive by train have to alight at Aluva and board a bus (private or KSRTC) either to Adimali or Kothamangalam. From both these places one can get a direct bus to Kunchithanny.

Demographics
As of 2011 Census, Kunchithanny had a population of 12,202 with 6,193 males and 6,009 females. The average male female sex ratio was 970 lower than the state average of 1084. In Kunchithanny, 9.56% of the population was under 6 years of age. Kunchithanny had an average literacy of 93.5% higher than the national average of 74% and lower than state average of 94%.

See also 
 Ellakkal

References 

Villages in Idukki district